Toronto North, also known as North Toronto, was a provincial riding that was created in Toronto, Ontario in 1894. It was in use until 1914. 

From 1894 to 1908 it elected a single MLA. In the 1908-1914 period it elected two members.

Prior to Toronto North's creation in 1894, the City of Toronto was represented as one single district that elected three members. In 1894 this district was split into four parts of which Toronto North was one. Toronto North occupied the northern part of the old Toronto district.  

In 1914 the North Toronto district was abolished and re-formed into two new districts called Toronto Northeast and Toronto Northwest.

Boundaries
The riding was established in 1894. The boundaries were College Street and Carlton Street to the south, Sumach Street to the east and Palmerston Avenue to the west. It was bounded on the north by the city limits.

In 1914, the riding was split between the new ridings of Toronto Northeast and Toronto Northwest.

Members of Provincial Parliament

Election results

Seat A

Seat B

References

Notes

Citations

Former provincial electoral districts of Ontario
Provincial electoral districts of Toronto